Anna Blinkova was the defending champion, but chose not to participate.

Vitalia Diatchenko won the title, defeating Robin Anderson in the final, 6–2, 6–3.

Seeds

Draw

Finals

Top half

Bottom half

References
Main Draw

Engie Open de Seine-et-Marne - Singles